Dr. Death is an American crime drama anthology television series created by Patrick Macmanus, based on the podcast of the same name, focusing on the titular Christopher Duntsch, a neurosurgeon who became infamous for permanently mutilating his patients, killing two of them. It premiered on Peacock on July 15, 2021. In July 2022, the series was renewed for a second season.

Premise
An arrogant, sinister doctor treats his Hippocratic Oath about the same way he treats his patients. As his malignant narcissism and psychopathy escalate, his fellow surgeons and a young assistant district attorney set out to stop him.

Cast

Season 1

Main

 Joshua Jackson as Christopher Duntsch
 Grace Gummer as Kim Morgan
 Christian Slater as Randall Kirby
 Alec Baldwin as Robert Henderson
 AnnaSophia Robb as Michelle Shughart

Recurring

 Fred Lehne as Don Duntsch
 Hubert Point-Du Jour as Josh Baker
 Maryann Plunkett as Madeline Beyer
 Grainger Hines as Earl Burke
 Kelsey Grammer as Dr. Geoffrey Skadden
 Dominic Burgess as Jerry Summers
 Molly Griggs as Wendy Young
 Laila Robins as Amy Piel
 Dashiell Eaves as Stan Novak
 Jennifer Kim as Stephanie Wu
 Kelly Kirklyn as Dorothy Burke
 Marceline Hugot as Rose Keller

Guest stars
 Carrie Preston as Robbie McClung

Season 2

Main
 Édgar Ramírez as Paolo Macchiarini
 Mandy Moore as  Benita Alexander

Recurring
 Rita Volk
 Judy Reyes
 Jack Davenport
 Annika Boras
 Sandra Andreis

Episodes

Production

Development
On October 3, 2018, NBCUniversal announced that Patrick Macmanus would adapt the Dr. Death podcast into a limited series and produce with Todd Black, Jason Blumenthal and Steve Tisch executive produce via Escape Artists, as well as Hernan Lopez and Marshall Lewy.  On September 17, 2019, NBCUniversal announced that the series would be distributed on its streaming service Peacock. In January 2020, it was announced Stephen Frears would direct the first two episodes. In September 2020, Frears was replaced by Maggie Kiley. On July 14, 2022, Peacock renewed the series for a second season with Ashley Michel Hoban promoted from a producer to an executive producer and new showrunner. The second season will focus on Paolo Macchiarini. On October 18, 2022, it was announced that Jennifer Morrison is set to direct episodes 1–4 and Laura Belsey is set to direct episodes 5–8 of the second season.

Casting
On August 9, 2019, Jamie Dornan, Alec Baldwin, and Christian Slater were cast as Dr. Christopher Duntsch, Robert Henderson, and Randall Kirby, respectively. In March 2020, Grace Gummer, Molly Griggs, AnnaSophia Robb and Chris Sullivan joined the cast of the series. On October 12, 2020, Joshua Jackson and Dominic Burgess joined the cast of the series, replacing Dornan and Sullivan respectively. Later in the same month, Hubert Point-Du Jour and Maryann Plunkett were cast in undisclosed capacities and character name roles. On February 12, 2021, Carrie Preston joined the cast. In November 2022, Édgar Ramírez was cast as Paolo Macchiarini and Mandy Moore was cast as Benita Alexander for the second season. On January 23, 2023, Rita Volk, Judy Reyes, Jack Davenport, Annika Boras, and Sandra Andreis joined the cast in recurring capacities for the second season.

Release
On May 17, 2021, alongside the release of an official trailer, it was announced that the series is scheduled to premiere in the summer of 2021. The series premiered on July 15, 2021, with an eight-episode release.

In Canada, the show debuted on Showcase on September 12, 2021.

The series had its linear premiere on the USA Network on October 5, 2022.

Reception
The review aggregator website Rotten Tomatoes reported a 92% approval rating with an average score of 7.4/10 based on 25 critic reviews. The website's critical consensus reads, "Though it keeps viewers in the waiting room a little too long, Dr. Death remains a horrifying tale of medical malpractice centered around Joshua Jackson's sufficiently unsettling performance." Metacritic, which uses a weighted average, assigned a score of 75 out of 100 based on 12 critics, indicating "generally favorable reviews".

Kristen Baldwin of Entertainment Weekly gave the series an A- and wrote a review saying, "The what and the how are harrowing enough. Dr. Death succeeds by focusing on the people who fought for years to make sure Christopher Duntsch could do no more harm."

References

External links
 
 

2020s American medical television series
2020s American crime drama television series
2021 American television series debuts
English-language television shows
Peacock (streaming service) original programming
Television series by Universal Content Productions
Television shows based on podcasts